Blaine is a home rule-class city in Lawrence County, Kentucky, United States. The population was 47 at the 2010 census, down from 245 at the 2000 census.

History
Blaine was originally settled  and established as a local trade center by 1882. The post office has been in operation since at least May 10, 1828 (Neri Swetnam, postmaster). Although the city was incorporated as "Blaine" on March 10, 1886, it was alternatively known as "Blainetown" or "Mouth of Hood" for the remainder of the 19th century.

In the 2016 city election, Brad Mattingly was elected mayor.

Geography
Blaine is located in western Lawrence County at  (38.025742, -82.855152), in the valley of Blaine Creek, a northeast-flowing tributary of the Big Sandy River. Hood Creek joins Blaine Creek from the south at Blaine.

Kentucky Route 32 passes through Blaine, leading east  to Louisa and west  to Sandy Hook. Kentucky Route 201 passes through the center of Blaine with KY 32 but leads north  to Webbville and south  to Staffordsville.

Demographics
At the 2000 census, there were 245 people, 95 households and 74 families residing in the city. The racial makeup of the city was 99.18% White, and 0.82% from two or more races.

There were 95 households, of which 34.7% had children under the age of 18 living with them, 58.9% were married couples living together, 13.7% had a female householder with no husband present, and 21.1% were non-families. 20.0% of all households were made up of individuals, and 10.5% had someone living alone who was 65 years of age or older. The average household size was 2.58 and the average family size was 2.89.

Age distribution was 25.3% under the age of 18, 8.2% from 18 to 24, 26.9% from 25 to 44, 25.7% from 45 to 64, and 13.9% who were 65 years of age or older. The median age was 33 years. For every 100 females, there were 105.9 males. For every 100 females age 18 and over, there were 96.8 males.

The median household income was $16,250, and the median family income was $24,000. Males had a median income of $26,250 versus $9,688 for females. The per capita income for the city was $9,740. About 29.4% of families and 39.0% of the population were below the poverty line, including 51.8% of those under the age of eighteen and 21.2% of those 65 or over.

Education
Students residing in Blaine usually attend:
 Blaine Elementary School
 Lawrence County High School

Government
Blaine is governed by a city commission form of government. The city commission consisted of a panel of four members: Jared Howard, Jeremy Webb, Regina Jordan, and Steve Harvey.

Climate
The climate in this area is characterized by relatively high temperatures and evenly distributed precipitation throughout the year.  According to the Köppen Climate Classification system, Blaine has a Humid subtropical climate, abbreviated "Cfa" on climate maps.

References

Cities in Kentucky
Cities in Lawrence County, Kentucky
Populated places established in 1886
1886 establishments in Kentucky